Coronadoa hasegawai is a species of sea snail, a marine gastropod mollusc in the family Scissurellidae, the top snails.

Description

Distribution
This marine species occurs off Japan.

References

 Geiger D. & Sasaki T. (2009). New Scissurellidae and Anatomidae from Manazuru, Sagami Bay, and Okinawa, Japan (Mollusca: Gastropoda: Vetigastropoda). Molluscan Research 29 (1) : 1–16
  Geiger D.L. (2012) Monograph of the little slit shells. Volume 1. Introduction, Scissurellidae. pp. 1–728. Volume 2. Anatomidae, Larocheidae, Depressizonidae, Sutilizonidae, Temnocinclidae. pp. 729–1291. Santa Barbara Museum of Natural History Monographs Number 7.

Scissurellidae
Gastropods described in 2009